A diving watch, also commonly referred to as a diver's or dive watch, is a watch designed for underwater diving that features, as a minimum, a water resistance greater than , the equivalent of . Watches conforming to ISO 6425 are marked with the word DIVER'S to distinguish ISO 6425 conformant diving watches from watches that might not be suitable for actual scuba diving.

To a large extent the diver's watch has been superseded by the personal dive computer, which provides an automatically initiated dive timer function along with real-time decompression computation and other (optional) functions.

History
The history of efforts to use watches underwater and to make watches that are water resistant, or waterproof and to make dive watches goes back to perhaps the 17th century. In the 19th century water and dust resistant watches were usually one-off pieces custom made for a particular customer and described as "Explorer's Watches". Hard hat divers of that period sometimes placed common pocketwatches on the inside of their helmets in order to know the time spent under water. Early in the 20th century such watches were industrially produced for military and commercial distribution. Like their predecessors early 20th century dive watches were developed in response to meet the needs of several different but related groups: explorers, navies, and professional divers.

In 1926, Rolex bought the patent for the “Oyster” watch case, featuring a hermetic seal. On 7 October 1927 an English swimmer, Mercedes Gleitze attempted to cross the English Channel with a new Rolex Oyster hanging round her neck by a ribbon on this swim. After more than 10 hours in the chilly water the watch remained sealed and kept good time throughout.

Omega SA is credited as the creator of the world's first industrially produced diving watch intended for commercial distribution, the rectangular Omega "Marine" with a patented double sliding and removable case, introduced in 1932.

Following a request made by the Royal Italian Navy, in September 1935, for a luminous underwater watch for divers, Panerai offered "Radiomir" underwater timepieces in 1936. These watches were made by Rolex for Panerai.

In addition, a large number of "canteen" style dive watches by Hamilton, Elgin or Waltham were made to military specification during and after World War II. However, these watches were made in small numbers, and were not intended for large-scale commercial distribution. Today, interest in these watches is limited to collectors.

In 1953, Lip-Blancpain's Fifty Fathoms waterproof watch was debuted at the Basel Fair. Various models were issued by Blancpain in small quantities to the military in several countries, including US and French Navy combat diver teams. The Fifty Fathoms was worn by Jacques Cousteau and his divers during the underwater film "Le monde du silence", which won the Palme d'or at the Cannes film festival in 1956, and in the US when TV star Lloyd Bridges wore a Blancpain Fifty Fathoms dive watch in a photo that appeared on the cover of the February 1962 edition of Skin Diver Magazine.

Zodiac debuted their Sea Wolf line of waterproof watches at the 1953 Basel Fair as well.

The Rolex Submariner was introduced at the Basel Watch Fair in 1954 which coincided with the development of self-contained underwater breathing apparatus, known as scuba. In 1959, the United States Navy Experimental Diving Unit evaluated five diving watches that included the Bulova US Navy Submersible Wrist Watch, Enicar Sherpa Diver 600, Enicar Seapearl 600, Blancpain Fifty Fathoms, and the Rolex Oyster Perpetual.

In 1961, Edox launched the Delfin line of watches, with industry-first double case backs for water resistance to 200 meters. They later released the Hydrosub line in 1963 featuring the first crown system with tension ring allowing depths of 500 meters.

It was the choice of watch for the character of 007 in the first ten James Bond films, causing the "Sub" to achieve an iconic status.

In 1965, Seiko put the 62MAS on the market, the first Japanese professional diver watch.

During the 1960s, commercial work in the oceans and seas created professional diving organisations that needed more robust watches designed for diving operations at greater depths. This led to the development of the first 'ultra water resistant' watches like the Rolex Sea-Dweller 2000 (2000 ft = 610 m), that became available in 1967, and was produced in several variations, and the Omega Seamaster Professional 600m/2000 ft, also known as the "Omega PloProf" (Plongeur Professionnel), that became available in 1970, and was produced in several variations.

In 1983, the US Navy Experimental Diving Unit evaluated several digital watches for use by US Navy divers.

In 1996, the International Organization for Standardization (ISO) introduced the standards and features for diving watches regulated by the ISO 6425 - Divers' watches international standard.

Many contemporary sports watches owe their design to diving watches.

The vast majority of divers now use electronic, wrist-worn dive computers. A dive computer or decompression meter is a device used by a scuba diver to measure the time and depth of a dive so that a safe ascent profile can be calculated and displayed so that the diver can avoid decompression sickness. Diving watches and depth gauges are however still commonly used by divers as backup instruments for overcoming dive computer malfunctions.

Characteristics

Many companies offer highly functional diving watches. Whilst diving watches are primarily tool watches, some companies offer models that can in addition to this be regarded by some as jewellery or fine mechanical devices. Diving watches can be analog or digital. Besides pure analog and digital models some diving watch models combine digital and analog elements.

ISO 6425 standard for diving watches
The standards and features for diver's watches are regulated by the International Organization for Standardization in the ISO 6425 standard; German Industrial Norm DIN 8306 is an equivalent standard. Besides water resistance standards to a minimum of 100 m depth rating ISO 6425 also provides minimum requirements for mechanical diver's watches (quartz and digital watches have slightly differing readability requirements) such as:
 Equipped with a diving time indicator (e.g. rotating bezel, digital display, or other). This device shall allow the reading of the diving time with a resolution of 1 min or better over at least 60 min.
 The presence of clearly distinguishable minute markings on the watch face.
 The presence of an indication that the watch is running in total darkness. This is usually indicated by a running second hand with a luminous tip or tail.
 Magnetic resistance. This is tested by 3 exposures to a direct current magnetic field of 4,800 A/m. The watch must keep its accuracy to ± 30 seconds/day as measured before the test despite the magnetic field.
 Shock resistance. This is tested by two shocks (one on the 9 o'clock side, and one to the crystal and perpendicular to the face). The shock is usually delivered by a hard plastic hammer mounted as a pendulum, so as to deliver a measured amount of energy, specifically, a 3 kg hammer with an impact velocity of 4.43 m/s. The change in rate allowed is ± 60 seconds/day.
 Chemical resistance. This is tested by immersion in a 30 g/L NaCl solution for 24 hours to test its rust resistance. This test water solution has a salinity comparable to normal seawater.
 Strap/band solidity. This is tested by applying a force of 200 N (45 lbf) to each spring bar (or attaching point) in opposite directions with no damage to the watch or attachment point.
 The presence of an End Of Life (EOL) indicator on battery powered watches.

Testing diving watches for ISO 6425 compliance is voluntary and involves costs, so not every manufacturer present their watches for certification according to this standard.

Watch case
The watch cases of diving watches must be adequately water (pressure) resistant and be able to endure the galvanic corrosiveness of seawater, so the cases are generally made out of materials like grade 316L or 904L austenitic stainless steel and other steel alloys with higher Pitting Resistance Equivalent factors (PRE-factors), titanium, ceramics and synthetic resins or plastics. If metal bracelets are used they should be made of the same metal alloy as the watch case to prevent corrosion of the metal with the lower PRE-factor as it will act as a sacrificial anode. The case must also provide an adequate degree of protection against external magnetic influences and shocks, though diver's watches do not have to be able to endure strong magnetic fields and shocks. To make mechanical watch movements themselves shock resistant various shock protection systems can be used.

The cases of diving watches have to be constructed more stoutly than typical dress watches, because of the requirements necessary to withstand a seawater environment at depth. As a consequence diving watches are relatively heavy and large compared to dress watches made out of similar materials. Under water sheer weight is of less consequence than buoyancy, which a diver can address by a buoyancy compensator ("BC") vest. Before the introduction of other case materials diving watch cases were made of stainless steel. Stainless steel is however still often used as case material in contemporary diving watches.

Elapsed time controller

Analog diving watches will often feature a rotating bezel, that allows for an easier reading of elapsed time of under one hour from a specific point. This is used to compute the length of a dive. (See Tachymeter.) Upon entering the water, the diver aligns the zero on the bezel with the minute (or sometimes second) hand, allowing the elapsed time to be read from the bezel. This saves the diver having to remember the exact water entry moment and having to perform arithmetic that would be necessary if the watch's regular dial was used. On diving watches the bezel is "unidirectional", i.e., it contains a ratchet so it can only be turned anti-clockwise to "increase" the apparent elapsed time, should the bezel be unintentionally rotated further during the dive. This is an important "fail safe" feature. If the bezel could be turned clockwise, this could suggest to a diver that the elapsed time is shorter than reality, thus indicating a falsely short elapsed time reading, and therefore falsely short saturation period, an assumption that can be highly dangerous.
Some diving watch models feature a lockable bezel to minimize the chance of unintentional bezel operation under water.

The exclusive use of a rotating bezel is considered a rudimentary diving technique in the 21st century, suitable for basic, shallow single gas (air) diving only. Non-basic diving profiles and depths past  require other more advanced timing and measuring methods to establish suitable decompression profiles to avoid decompression sickness. Besides for basic diving and as a backup for monitoring time during more complex preplanned diving, the one-way bezel can also be used for other situations in which a measurement of elapsed time of under one hour might be useful, like cooking.

Digital dive watches usually perform the elapsed time function by use of a standard stop watch function. Digital dive watches may also feature a depth gauge and logging features, but are not usually regarded as a substitute for a dedicated dive computer.

Bezel markings

Most contemporary dive watches with non-uniform time markings – generally in one minute intervals for the first 15 or 20 minutes – on their bezels are the result of copying old bezel designs. In the past divers typically planned a dive to a certain maximum depth based on now obsolete US Navy dive tables, and dived according to the planned dive profile. If the dive profile allowed a bottom time of 35 minutes the diver, upon entering the water, would set the marker on the bezel, 35 minutes ahead of the minute hand. The diver calculated this with the 60 - bottom time formulae (60 - 35 = 25, for 35 minutes bottom time the diver would align the 25 minute bezel-mark with the minute hand). Once the minute hand reached the main-marker on the bezel the diver would begin his ascent to the surface. The one minute intervals scale helped with timing the ascent and whatever safety stop the diver deemed necessary. For contemporary diving methods the 15 or 20 minute "count-down" bezel is quite antiquated, yet still the only useful mechanical dive timing device available to date. A different type of bezels used on dive watches are (multiple) decompression time interval bezels as featured on Doxa and Jenny watches. The bezel inlay containing the markings in the bezel ring can be made of metal or feature more scratch-resistant top materials like technical ceramic or synthetic sapphire.

GMT dive watches
There are some analog dive watches available with a GMT complication. GMT watches were designed for long-haul aircrew and other users who want to track time in different time zones. These watches have an additional GMT watch hand and in the case of diving watches can have a rotating bezel with 24-hours markings instead of minute markings used for reading of elapsed time. With the help of the GMT hand and a correctly adjusted 24-hours bezel the time in two different time zones can be easily read without having to perform arithmetic.

Crystal
Diving watches have relatively thick watch crystals. Sometimes domed crystals are used to enhance the pressure-resistance of the watch and to improve the watch face legibility under water. The typical materials used for crystals are acrylic glass, hardened glass and synthetic sapphire which all have their pros and cons. Acrylic glass is very resistant to breakage; it can easily be scratched, but small scratches can be buffed out with polishing compounds. Hardened glass is more scratch-resistant than acrylic glass and less brittle than sapphire. Sapphire is very scratch-resistant but less shatterproof than the other options. Anti-reflective coatings are generally applied on sapphire crystals to enhance the legibility of the watch. Some manufacturers use sapphire/hardened glass laminate crystals, where the scratch-resistance of sapphire is combined with the better shatter-resistance of hardened glass.

Watch crystals can also be applied as display backs to view the watch movement, but these are a rare feature on diving watches.

Crown

Analog diving watches must have a water resistant crown. Some models have the crown mounted in unconventional positions like 4, 8 or 9 o'clock to avert or reduce discomfort from the crown touching the wearers (left) wrist or back of the hand. Often the crown has to be unscrewed to set or adjust the time and date and afterwards retightened to restore the water resistance of the watch and minimize the chance of unintentional operation under water. There are also watch models where a locking handle, separate knob or an extra crown cover has to be manipulated before the crown can be operated. There are however models that have crowns that are operated like the crowns of non diver's analog watches. Screw down or otherwise locking crowns and traditionally operated water resistant crowns can not be operated under water. The watch case of diving and other tool watches often feature protruding crown protectors or (integrated) crown guards/shoulders for (semi-)recessing the crown and hence reduce mechanical damage and snagging risks.

Pushers
Digital and some analog chronograph diving watches - such as the Breitling Avenger Seawolf Chronograph or Sinn U1000 - have specially-designed push pieces that can be operated at depth without allowing water to enter the case.

Helium release valve

Some diving watches intended for saturation diving at great depths are fitted with a helium or mixed breathing gas release or escape valve to prevent the crystal from being blown off by an internal pressure build up caused by helium that has seeped into the watch case in helium enriched environments (helium atoms are the smallest natural gas particles found in nature) as the watch and diver adjust to normal atmospheric conditions. Other helium safe/for mixed-gas rated diving watches can withstand the helium used in certain diving situations by using gaskets that simply do not allow helium gas to enter the watch case in a harmful way in the first place.

Watch strap/bracelet

Watch straps or bracelets for diving watches are generally made  of materials that are adequately water (pressure) resistant and able to endure the galvanic corrosiveness of seawater. In practical terms most diving watches feature a rubber, silicone rubber, polyurethane or fabric watch strap or a stainless steel or titanium metal link or mesh bracelet of adequate length to facilitate wearing the watch over a diving suit sleeve. Some watch straps allow an increase in length by adding a diving suit extension strap piece to the standard watch strap. If required more than one diving suit extension strap piece can be added to the standard watch strap. With increasing depth and rising water pressure the (sleeved) wrist of a diver is exposed to compression effects that have a shrinking effect on the wrist circumference. Many watch straps intended for diving watches have rippled or vented sections near the attachment points on the watch case to facilitate the required flexibility to strap the watch tightly for normal wear at the surface whilst keeping the watch sufficiently tightly in place on the divers wrist at depth. Metal link bracelets theoretically have more failure points compared to metal mesh bracelets and watch straps due to the use of link connection parts like split pins or screw pins. One piece (NATO style) nylon fabric straps that slide under the watch case through both spring bars (or attaching points between the watch case and strap) are used to minimize the chance of losing the watch due to a spring bar or attachment point failure.

Legibility

The dials and markers on the watch face and bezel have to be legible under water and in low light conditions. An indication that the watch is running in total darkness also has to be present. For easy legibility most diving watches have high contrasting, non-cluttered dials and markers with a large, easily identifiable minute hand. The markers for 3, 6, 9 and (especially) 12 o'clock on the watch face and the zero marker on the bezel of analogue diver's watches are usually conspicuously styled to prevent disorientation induced read out errors. A styling of the hands where no hand can temporarily totally overlay and hence obscure the position of another hand is also desirable to promote constant legibility and prevent read out errors. For low light conditions luminous phosphorescent non-toxic strontium aluminate based lume pigments marketed under brand names like Super-LumiNova or NoctiLumina and tritium based self-powered lighting devices called "gaseous tritium light source" (GTLS) are applied on the dials and markers. On digital diving watches, lighted displays are used for legibility under low light conditions.

Power reserve indicator
A diving watch with an electric battery powered movement must have an End Of Life (EOL) indicator, usually in the form of a two or four second jump of the second hand or a warning message on a digital display to safeguard against insufficient power reserve during underwater activities. Some electric and mechanical powered movement models have power reserve indicators that show the current power status of the watch.

Water resistance 

The International Organization for Standardization issued a standard for water resistant watches which also prohibits the term waterproof to be used with watches, which many countries have adopted.

Water resistance is achieved by the gaskets which forms a watertight seal, used in conjunction with a sealant applied on the case to help keep water out. The material of the case must also be tested in order to pass as water resistant.

None of the tests defined by ISO 2281 for the Water Resistant mark are suitable to qualify a watch for scuba diving. Such watches are designed for everyday life and must be water resistant during exercises such as swimming. They can be worn in different temperature and pressure conditions but are under no circumstances designed for scuba diving.

The standards for diving watches are regulated by the ISO 6425 international standard. The watches are tested in static or still water under 125% of the rated (water) pressure, thus a watch with a 200 m rating will be water resistant if it is stationary and under 250 m of static water. The testing of the water resistance is fundamentally different from non-dive watches, because every watch has to be fully tested.

ISO 6425 water resistance testing of a diver's watch consists of:
 Immersion of the watch in 30 cm of water for 50 hours.
 Immersion of the watch in water under 125% of the rated pressure with a force of 5 N perpendicular to the crown and pusher buttons (if any) for 10 minutes.
 Immersion of the watch in 30 cm of water at the following temperatures for 5 minutes each, 40 °C, 5 °C and 40 °C again, with the transition between temperatures not to exceed 1 minute. No evidence of water intrusion or condensation is allowed.
 Immersion of the watch in a suitable pressure vessel and subjecting it to 125% of the rated pressure for 2 hours. The pressure must be applied within 1 minute. Subsequently, the overpressure shall be reduced to 0.3 bar within 1 minute and maintained at this pressure for 1 hour. No evidence of water intrusion or condensation is allowed.

 For mixed-gas diving the watch has to be immersed in a suitable pressure vessel and subjecting it to 125% of the rated pressure for 15 days in a (helium enriched) breathing gas mix. Subsequently, the overpressure shall be reduced to normal pressure within 3 minutes. No evidence of water intrusion, condensation or problems caused by internal overpressure are allowed.
 An optional test originating from the ISO 2281 tests (but not required for obtaining ISO 6425 approval) is exposing the watch to an overpressure of 2 bar, no more than 50 µg/min of air is allowed to get inside the case.

Except the thermal shock resistance test all further ISO 6425 testing should be conducted at 18 °C to 25 °C temperature.
The required 125% test pressure provides a safety margin against dynamic pressure increase events, water density variations (seawater is 2 to 5% denser than freshwater) and degradation of the seals.

Movement induced dynamic pressure increase is sometimes the subject of urban myths and marketing arguments for diver's watches with high water resistance ratings.

Water resistance classification
Watches are classified by their degree of water resistance, which roughly translates to the following (1 meter ≈ 3.28 feet):

Note: The depth specified on the watch dial or case represents the results of tests done in the lab, not in the ocean.

Some watches are rated in bars instead of meters. Since 1 bar is approximately the pressure exerted by 10 m of water, a rating in bars may be multiplied by 10 to be approximately equal to that based on meters. Therefore, a 20 bar watch is equivalent to a 200-meter watch. Some watches are rated in atmospheres (atm), which are about 1% greater than bars. In the United Kingdom, scuba divers and others often use the word atmosphere interchangeably with bar (1 atm = 1.01325 bar, or 101,325 Pa).

Watches designed for extreme water resistance

In 1992, a Comex diver achieved a simulated  of seawater depth in an on-shore hyperbaric chamber as part of the Hydra 10 programme. A Hydreliox (hydrogen-helium-oxygen) gas mixture was used as breathing gas. The watches used during this scientific record dives were Rolex Sea-Dwellers with a  depth rating and these feats were used in advertising. The complexity, medical problems and physiological limits such as those imposed by high pressure nervous syndrome and accompanying high costs of professional saturation diving to depths exceeding  and the development of deep water atmospheric diving suits and remotely operated underwater vehicles in offshore oilfield drilling and production effectively nixed the need for ever deeper non-atmospheric crewed intervention in the ocean.

Air filled watches
This watch represented in its launch year the most water resistant mechanical watch in serial production.
Normal surface air filled watch cases and crystals designed for extreme depths must be dimensionally large to cope with the encountered water pressure.

Liquid filled watches
The cases of some diving watches designed for extreme depths are filled with silicone oil or fluorinated oil (oil in which all the hydrogen is replaced by fluorine) exploiting the relative incompressibility of liquids. This technology only works with quartz movements as a mechanical movement does not work properly in the oil filled case. A problem with this technology is to accommodate for thermal expansion of the liquid contained inside the watch. This property endangers a traditional watch case since the crystal would blow out from any significant internal overpressure. On the UX (EZM 2B), the case back contains a large movable piston with an o-ring seal, allowing the liquid inside the watch case to expand and contract to adjust internal fluid volume and equalize with outside pressure. The liquid filling improves the watch face legibility under water significantly, due to reduced refractive index differences between the watch crystal and its adjacent media and eliminates crystal fogging due to condensation. To obtain its water resistance the Sinn UX (EZM 2B) stainless steel watch case has a diameter of 44 mm, thickness of 13.3 mm and the case and bracelet weigh 105 g. This is dimensionally modest compared to air filled diving watches designed for extreme depths.

Full ocean depth prototype/experimental watches
In January 1960, a Rolex Deep Sea Special prototype diving watch attached to the hull of the bathyscaphe Trieste reached a record depth of   ± of seawater during a descent to the bottom of the "Western Pool" of the Challenger Deep, the deepest surveyed point in the oceans. The watch survived and tested as having functioned normally during its descent and ascent. The Deep Sea Special was a technology demonstration and marketing project, and the watch never went into production.

The watch was designed to be waterproof up to 1500 bar/ and functioned normally during its descent and ascent.

, the record for the deepest normally functioning experimental diving watch is held by the Omega Seamaster Planet Ocean Ultra Deep Professional after reaching a (revised) depth of  ± of seawater during a descent to the bottom of the "Eastern Pool" of the Challenger Deep by the Five Deeps Expedition. Two of these watches were attached to the outside of the Deep-Submergence Vehicle Limiting Factor: one on each of the main vessel's robotic arms and an additional one on the ultra-deep-sea lander Skaff.

Maintenance

Diving watch manufacturers recommend divers to have their diving watch pressure tested by a service and repair facility annually or every two to five years and have the seals or gaskets replaced. Besides that, simple maintenance by the owner is also important. Manufacturers recommend rinsing the watch in fresh water after use in seawater, but leaving a diver's watch in fresh water overnight is a good method{ to protect the watch from corrosion and to keep the crown, bezel, buttons and pressure sensors on digital ones working. Some watch companies have restricting or limiting policies like manufacturer service center maintenance and repair only in effect that can interfere with other precautionary and maintenance policies or expeditious turnaround, modification or long term support needs.

Precautions
Divers have to inspect their watch and the wrist band for defects before every dive and especially in case it came into contact with dirt, gasoline or strong chemicals, powerful magnetic fields or was banged against something hard during use. Additionally watches with mechanical movements should also be hand-wound or in case of automatic movements that can not be hand-wound given sufficient motion to self-wind before every dive to ensure a fully charged mainspring.

See also
 Chronometer

References

External links
Xavier Markl, Monochrome-watches, A technical perspective Dive Watches

Underwater diving safety equipment
Watches